The Gamers 2037 is an Australian television program for children which made its 9Go! debut on 14 November 2020.

Cast
 Miah Madden as Kite
 Marvin Rowland as Galahad
 Ashleigh Ross as Xeon
 Keaton Stewart as Game Master
 Sarah Spackman as Computer Voice

Production
Speech Graphics provided the computer facial animation for the show. The Gamers 2037 was made into 26 episodes by Ambience Entertainment.

See also
 Random and Whacky
 For Real

References

External links
 

2020s Australian drama television series
2020 Australian television series debuts
Australian children's television series
English-language television shows
Nine Network original programming
Television shows set in Sydney
9Go! original programming